Dielis trifasciata, also known as the three-banded scoliid wasp is a species of the family Scoliidae (scoliid wasps).

Description
These wasps show yellow bands on the three anterior abdominal segments. In males the last three abdominal segments are black and the scutellum has a single yellow band.

Biology
These parasitic wasps lay eggs on larvae of the scarab Phyllophaga portoricensis. Adults feed on pollen.

Distribution
Dielis trifasciata is present in southern Florida and in most of the Greater Antilles.

References

Parasitic wasps
Insects described in 1793
Scoliidae